The Kongana shrew (Sylvisorex konganensis) is a species of mammal in the family Soricidae endemic to Central African Republic. Its natural habitat is subtropical or tropical moist lowland forests.

References

Sylvisorex
Endemic fauna of the Central African Republic
Taxonomy articles created by Polbot
Mammals described in 1996